Lesbian, gay, bisexual, and transgender (LGBT) people in Puerto Rico have gained some legal rights in recent years. Same sex relationships have been legal in Puerto Rico since 2003, and same-sex marriage and adoptions are also permitted. U.S. federal hate crime laws apply in Puerto Rico.

Violence against the LGBT community
In recent years, numerous LGBT people have been murdered with some laying the blame for these acts on politicians and on the religious community.

The dismembered body of 19-year-old college student Jorge Steven López Mercado was discovered 14 November 2009 in Cayey, a city located in the island's interior region. López was widely known as a volunteer for organizations advocating gay rights and HIV prevention, and activists planned remembrance vigils for him in cities including San Juan, Chicago, and New York. According to local police, it is under investigation as a possible hate crime, under the newly approved U.S. Federal hate crimes law which includes crimes against people who are (or perceived to be) gay or transgender people. Juan A. Martinez Matos was arrested a few days after López Mercado's body was discovered. On 12 May 2010, Martinez Matos pleaded guilty and was sentenced to 99 years in prison for the murder of López Mercado.

On 19 April 2010, the body of Ashley Santiago, a transgender woman who resided in the town of Corozal was discovered in the kitchen of her home. Santiago, a stylist at a local salon, was found naked on the floor and was stabbed 14 times by an unknown assailant.

On 13 September 2010, the bodies of Justo Luis "Michelle" Gonzalez and Miguel Orlando "La Flaca" Soto, two transsexuals were found murdered along a road in the small town of Juana Diaz.  With these two deaths, LGBT activists on the island have stated that nine gay and transgender people have been killed over the last 10 months on the island, and local authorities have not adequately responded to these crimes. In October 2012, Malena Suarez, a transgender woman living in Carolina, was found dead at her home as a result of multiple stabbings.  Her death marked the 30th anti-LGBT homicide in Puerto Rico in a decade.

In February 2020, Alexa Negrón Luciano, a homeless trans woman was shot to death in a murder filmed by the perpetrators. The victim previously was misgendered at a restaurant by customers that falsely accused her of attempting to take photos of other women, resulting in the arrival of police. The murder of Alexa highlighted the discrimination and violence transgender people face on the island. A year after her murder authorities had still not solved the case. The murder of Michelle Ramos Vargas in September of that same year marked the sixth killing of a transgender person. From 2019 - 2021, at least twelve transgender people had been murdered in Puerto Rico.

History of the LGBT movement

In 1973 the Comunidad de Orgullo Gay (the Gay Pride Community) was the first gay rights organization in Puerto Rico. In 1991, the Coalición Puertorriqueña de Lesbianas y Homosexuales (the Puerto Rican Lesbian and Gay Coalition) was also formed. That same year, one of the first LGBT pride parades was organized in Puerto Rico, and subsequent events occur each year in San Juan and Cabo Rojo.

Between the 1990s and 2008, various LGBT community groups arose, as there was more public discussion about sexual orientation, gender identity, human rights and the HIV-AIDS pandemic.  Today, there are numerous Puerto Rican LGBT rights organizations and nightclubs, with most of the LGBTQ organizations based in and around San Juan, Cabo Rojo, and Vieques.

On 6 November 2012, Popular Democratic Party candidate Pedro Peters Maldonado became the first openly gay politician elected to public office in the island's history, when he won a seat in San Juan's city council.

Justin Santiago, a Puerto Rican trans man from Barranquitas was the first person in Puerto Rico  who changed his name and gender on his birth certificate, and live as a trans man. In his youth, Santiago had been forced to attend conversion therapy sessions, a pseudoscientific practice that aims to change the ideas of LGBT people. Afterwards, Santiago advocated for the conversion therapy ban which was signed into law by Ricardo Rosselló in 2019.

Loverbar was a queer bar, restaurant and nightclub located in Río Piedras, San Juan, Puerto Rico that opened in 2020 and closed the following year. As a queer club it was the first of its kind in Puerto Rico, with Refinery29 calling it "the queer destination for everything exciting, progressive, and radical about the Puerto Rican queer scene."

See also

LGBT rights in Puerto Rico
Pedro Julio Serrano
LGBT rights in the Americas
LGBT in the United States
Same-sex marriage in Puerto Rico

References